Bismuth(III) oxide is perhaps the most industrially important compound of bismuth. It is also a common starting point for bismuth chemistry. It is found naturally as the mineral bismite (monoclinic) and sphaerobismoite (tetragonal, much more rare), but it is usually obtained as a by-product of the smelting of copper and lead ores. Dibismuth trioxide is commonly used to produce the "Dragon's eggs" effect in fireworks, as a replacement of red lead.

Structure
The structures adopted by  differ substantially from those of arsenic(III) oxide, and antimony(III) oxide, .

Bismuth oxide,  has five crystallographic polymorphs. The room temperature phase, α- has a monoclinic crystal structure. There are three high temperature phases, a tetragonal β-phase, a body-centred cubic γ-phase, a cubic δ- phase and an ε-phase.
The room temperature α-phase has a complex structure with layers of oxygen atoms with layers of bismuth atoms between them. The bismuth atoms are in two different environments which can be described as distorted 6 and 5 coordinate respectively.

β- has a structure related to fluorite.

δ- has a defective fluorite-type crystal structure in which two of the eight oxygen sites in the unit cell are vacant.
ε- has a structure related to the α- and β- phases but as the structure is fully ordered it is an ionic insulator. It can be prepared by hydrothermal means and transforms to the α- phase at 400 °C.

The monoclinic α-phase transforms to the cubic δ- when heated above 729 °C, which remains the structure until the melting point, 824 °C, is reached. The γ-phase can exist at room temperature with very slow cooling rates, but α- always forms on cooling the β-phase. Even though when formed by heat, it reverts to α- when the temperature drops back below 727 °C, δ- can be formed directly through electrodeposition and remain relatively stable at room temperature, in an electrolyte of bismuth compounds that is also rich in sodium or potassium hydroxide so as to have a pH near 14.

Conductivity
The α-phase exhibits p-type electronic conductivity (the charge is carried by positive holes) at room temperature which transforms to n-type conductivity (charge is carried by electrons) between 550 °C and 650 °C, depending on the oxygen partial pressure.
The conductivity in the β, γ and δ-phases is predominantly ionic with oxide ions being the main charge carrier. Of these δ- has the highest reported conductivity. At 750 °C the conductivity of δ- is typically about 1 S cm−1, about three orders of magnitude greater than the intermediate phases and four orders greater than the monoclinic phase. 
δ- has a defective fluorite-type crystal structure in which two of the eight oxygen sites in the unit cell are vacant. The Bi–O bonds have covalent bond character and are therefore weaker than purely ionic bonds, so the oxygen ions can jump into vacancies more freely.

The arrangement of oxygen atoms within the unit cell of δ- has been the subject of much debate in the past. Three different models have been proposed. Gattow and Schroder (1962) rejected this model, preferring to describe each oxygen site (8c site) in the unit cell as having 75% occupancy. In other words, the six oxygen atoms are randomly distributed over the eight possible oxygen sites in the unit cell. Currently, most experts seem to favour the latter description as a completely disordered oxygen sub-lattice accounts for the high conductivity in a better way.

Willis (1965) used neutron diffraction to study the fluorite system. He determined that it could not be described by the ideal fluorite crystal structure, rather, the fluorine atoms were displaced from regular 8c positions towards the centres of the interstitial positions. Shuk et al. (1996) and Sammes et al. (1999) suggest that because of the high degree of disorder in δ-, the Willis model could also be used to describe its structure.

Use in solid-oxide fuel cells (SOFCs)
Interest has centred on δ- as it is principally an ionic conductor. In addition to electrical properties, thermal expansion properties are very important when considering possible applications for solid electrolytes. High thermal expansion coefficients represent large dimensional variations under heating and cooling, which would limit the performance of an electrolyte. The transition from the high-temperature δ- to the intermediate β- is accompanied by a large volume change and consequently, a deterioration of the mechanical properties of the material. This, combined with the very narrow stability range of the δ-phase (727–824 °C), has led to studies on its stabilization to room temperature.

 easily forms solid solutions with many other metal oxides. These doped systems exhibit a complex array of structures and properties dependent on the type of dopant, the dopant concentration and the thermal history of the sample. The most widely studied systems are those involving rare earth metal oxides, including yttria, . Furthermore, their ionic radii decrease fairly uniformly from  (1.032 Å), through  (0.983 Å),  (0.938 Å),  (0.912 Å) and  (0.89 Å), to  (0.861 Å) (known as the "lanthanide contraction"), making them useful to study the effect of dopant size on the stability of the  phases.

 has also been used as sintering additive in the -doped zirconia system for intermediate temperature SOFC.

Preparation

The trioxide can be prepared by ignition of bismuth hydroxide. Bismuth trioxide can be also obtained by heating bismuth subcarbonate at approximately 400 °C.

Reactions

However, when acidic cations such as Si(IV) are introduced within the structure of the bismuth oxide, the reaction with  do not occur.

Bismuth(III) oxide reacts with a mixture of concentrated aqueous sodium hydroxide and bromine or aqueous potassium hydroxide and bromine to form sodium bismuthate or potassium bismuthate, respectively.

Usage

Medical devices 
Bismuth oxide is occasionally used in dental materials to make them more opaque to X-rays than the surrounding tooth structure. In particular, bismuth (III) oxide has been used in hydraulic silicate cements (HSC), originally in "MTA" (a trade name, standing for the chemically-meaningless "mineral trioxide aggregate") from 10 to 20% by mass with a mixture of mainly di- and tri-calcium silicate powders. Such HSC is used for dental treatments such as: apicoectomy, apexification, pulp capping, pulpotomy, pulp regeneration, internal repair of iatrogenic perforations, repair of resorption perforations, root canal sealing and obturation. MTA sets into a hard filling material when mixed with water. Some resin-based materials also include an HSC with bismuth oxide. Problems have allegedly arisen with bismuth oxide because it is claimed not to be inert at high pH, specifically that it slows the setting of the HSC, but also over time can lose color by exposure to light or reaction with other materials that may have been used in the tooth treatment, such as sodium hypochlorite.

Radiative cooling 
Bismuth oxide was used to develop a scalable colored surface high in solar reflectance and heat emissivity for passive radiative cooling. The paint was non-toxic and demonstrated a reflectance of 99% and emittance of 97%. In field tests the coating exhibited significant cooling power and reflected potential for the further development of colored surfaces practical for large-scale radiative cooling applications.

References

Further reading

Bismuth oxide
Pyrotechnic oxidizers
Sesquioxides